Stilla fiordlandica is a species of sea snail, a marine gastropod mollusk in the family Raphitomidae.

Description
The length of the shell attains 1.8 mm, its diameter 1 mm.

Distribution
This marine species is endemic to New Zealand and occurs off Fiordland.

References

 Fleming, C.A. (1948) New species and genera of marine Mollusca from the Southland Fiords. Transactions of the Royal Society of New Zealand, 77, 72–92.
 Powell, A.W.B. 1979 New Zealand Mollusca: Marine, Land and Freshwater Shells, Collins, Auckland
 Spencer, H.G., Marshall, B.A. & Willan, R.C. (2009). Checklist of New Zealand living Mollusca. Pp 196-219. in: Gordon, D.P. (ed.) New Zealand inventory of biodiversity. Volume one. Kingdom Animalia: Radiata, Lophotrochozoa, Deuterostomia. Canterbury University Press, Christchurch.

External links
 
 Spencer H.G., Willan R.C., Marshall B.A. & Murray T.J. (2011). Checklist of the Recent Mollusca Recorded from the New Zealand Exclusive Economic Zone

fiordlandica
Gastropods described in 1948
Gastropods of New Zealand